Brahmachari  is a 2019 Indian Kannada-language comedy drama film written and directed by Chandra Mohan. The film is produced by Uday K. Mehta under the banner UKM Studios. It features Sathish Ninasam and Aditi Prabhudeva. The supporting cast includes  Akshatha Srinivas, Shivaraj KR Pete, Ashok, Akanksha, Achyuth Kumar, Padmaja Rao and H. G. Dattatreya. The score and soundtrack for the film is by Dharma Vish and the cinematography is by Ravi.V.

Cast 
 Sathish Ninasam as Ram
 Aditi Prabhudeva as Sunitha Krishnamoorthy
 Akshatha Srinivas
 Shivaraj KR Pete
 Ashok 
 Akanksha
 Achyuth Kumar
 Padmaja Rao
 H. G. Dattatreya as Dr. Ramdev

Production 
The film was announced on 14 April 2019. The film team had announced Sathish Ninasam as the main lead. Later Aditi Prabhudeva was on board as the female lead. H. G. Dattatreya was approached for a pivotal character in the film. The team later announced that Akshata Srinivas is portraying another important character in the film. The film was shot in and around Bengaluru and Srirangapattana.

Soundtrack 

The film's background score and the soundtracks are composed by Dharma Vish. The music rights were acquired by Ananda Audio.

Release and reception 
The film was released on 29 November 2019. The film met with mixed responses from both audiences and critics and was a commercial failure.

The Times of India gave 3.5/5 and wrote "Bramhachari deals with a serious issue, but never gets preachy. In fact, the performance issues of the protagonist are just the catalyst to a crazy comedy of errors. If you like comedies with that right bit of innuendos and gags, this one might just entertain you."

Bangalore Mirror gave 3/5 and wrote "Brahmachari is not a grand effort of a star vehicle. It depends heavily on the anecdotal comedy that is the staple of sex comedies. The story has been packaged well and is not short of the entertainment quotient. And of course there are the safety nets, in case you need them."

References

External links 

 

2010s Kannada-language films
2019 comedy-drama films
Indian comedy-drama films
Films shot in Mysore